Damari is both a surname and a given name. Notable people with the name include:

Nitzan Damari (born 1987), Israeli footballer
Omer Damari (born 1989), Israeli footballer
Shoshana Damari (1923–2006), Israeli singer
Da'Mari Scott (born 1995), American football player

See also
Damaris (disambiguation)